Pakor I (also spelled Pakoros I) was king of Persis in the first half of the 1st century CE, a vassal state of the Parthian Empire. He is known to have adopted on his coins the same hairstyle used on the coins of the Parthian king Phraates III.

References

Sources 
 .
 
 
 
 
 

1st-century monarchs in the Middle East
Year of death unknown
Year of birth unknown
1st-century Iranian people
Zoroastrian rulers
Kings of Persis